Tirunelveli Tamil also known as Nellai Tamil or ThenPaandi Tamil is one of the dialects of Tamil which is spoken in the districts of Tirunelveli, Tenkasi, Thoothukudi and Kanyakumari, as well as over the vast area of south Tamil Nadu which was once ruled by the Pandiya Kings. Nellai Tamil is also known as Thenpaandi Tamil. Thenpaandi Seemai refers to the part of a Pandya kingdom which includes the present day Tirunelveli, Tenkasi and Tuticorin Districts.

Features 

The Tirunelveli Tamil Dialect (TTD) has on the whole 41 phonemes of which 31 are segmental and the remaining 10 are suprasegmental.
Nellai Tamil also preserves archaic kinship terms that other dialects have long discarded. However, the most unusual feature of the Tamil spoken in the Tirunelveli region is that the medial "c" is pronounced as a voiceless palatal affricate as in Old Tamil and has not undergone the change to the dental "s" as in most other dialects.

Regions of Nellai Tamil 
Tirunelveli      
Sankarankovil
Palayamkottai
Tuticorin
Melapalayam
Virudhunagar
Cheranmahadevi
Poovankurichi
Sivagiri
Tenkasi
Rajapalayam
Sivakasi
Srivilliputhur
Eruvadi
Vasudevanallur
Kalakkad
Ilanji
Surandai
Panpoli
Vadakarai
Kovilpatti
Ambasamudram
Kallidaikurichi
Uppuvaniamuthur
Kadayam
Alangulam
Thiruchendur
Manadu
Ezuvaraimukki 
Srivaikundam
Nazareth
Udangudi
Thisayanvilai
Kuttam
Nanguneri
Kanganankulam
Kadayanallur
Radhapuram
Sathankulam
Valliyur
Panagudi
Pavoorchatram
Thippanampatty
Sengottai
Sivanadanoor
Kurumbalaperi
Puliyankudi
Vickramasingapuram
Papanasam
Kadayanallur
Kazhugumalai
Uvari
Peikulam
Melaseval
Pattamadai

Peculiar Nellai Tamil Words/ Phrases 
Annaachi = அன்னாச்சி = Used to call a person of respect
Yeppadi Irukkeeya? = How are you? (with respect)
Chuvamaa Irukeyalaa? = Are you doing well?, Are you in good health? (with respect)
Chuvamthaana = Are you doing well?
Thoorama? = Going somewhere far?
Elei, Yala, Yelu = Dude
Kooruketta = Without sharpness of mind
Yennala Panutha = What are you doing dude?
Yabla = Feminine of Yela - Used to call a girl (without respect) 
Aveyn Cholludhamle = He says (without respect) 
Naa Cholludhamla = I am telling you (without respect) 
Payaluva = Boys
Podusu = Little one (child)
Payavulla = Fellow (akin to 'homie')/ Son of (e.g.: Pya Payavulla means Son of a Demon)
Pileyl = Girls
Pottachi = A girl (without respect)
Avanuvol, Ivanuvol = Those guys, These guys
Penjathi/ Ponjathi = Wife
Engana? = Where?
Inganakula = Nearby
Anganakula = Within there
Nikki = (something is) waiting / standing
Pidikki = to like, (something is) holding
Vaaren = I'm coming
...pla = it seems - used as a suffice to personal verbs (e.g.) Vanthapla = He/she came, Chonnapla = He/She told
Choli = Work
Choliyatthu = Without any work
Andhaanikku = So
Kalavaani = Thief
Aviya/ Avuha, Iviya/ Ivuha = Him (respectful form - third person singular), They (also used for third person plural)
Thoraval = Key
Pydha = Type/ Wheel
Payya = Slowly
Anthaala = Likewise(Appadiye)
Kaangala = Not found(Kaanum)
Thaai = Younger sister(thangachi)
Osaka = Above (at a higher place)
Yekka= Elder Sister
Kottikaren = Fool
Vaariyal = Sweeper
Anney = Elder Brother
Atthaan/ Machaan = Brother-in-law, cousin brother
Anni/ Maini/ Mathini = Sister-in-law (wife's elder sister/ elder brother's wife), cousin sister
Maini= Sister-in-law (wife's elder sister) in some cases maternal uncle's elder daughter
Kolunthiya = Sister-in-law (husband's younger sister)
Machi/ Mottamaadi = Terrace
Nadumatthi = Exact centre
Appadi podu aruvala! = Attaboy! (Lit. Put your machete like that!)
Adichan gosu! = What a response!

Movies featuring Nellai Tamil 
Nellai Tamil has been used in a number of Tamil movies. Some of them are
Seevalaperi Pandi,
Dum Dum Dum,
Saamy,
Ayya,
Kovil,
Thamiraparani,
Roja,
Thirunelveli,
Kushi,
Sillunu Oru Kadhal,
Raman Thediya Seethai,
Pidichirukku,
Shankhar Ooru Rajapalayam,
Kannum Kannum,
Unakkum Enakkum Something Something,
Dasavatharam,
Seval,
Thoothukudi,
Veeramum Eeramum,
Gentleman,
Anniyan,
Saadhu,
Pudhu Nellu Pudhu Naatthu,
Punnagai Mannan,
Velai Kidaichiruchu,
Thanneer Thanneer,
Angadi Theru,
Kadal,
Osthee,
Singam 1,
Singam 2,
Singam 3,
Bhairava (Vijay Film),
Asuran (Dhanush Film)

Kamal Haasan's 2015 movie Papanasam, a remake of the 2013 Malayalam film Drishyam, also features Nellai Tamil.

References

Bibliography 

 

Languages of India
Tamil dialects
Tirunelveli